GoTo Resolve (formerly GoToAssist & RescueAssist) is a cloud-based remote support platform designed and targeted at IT support teams and customer support organizations. In 2018, LogMeIn's GoToAssist was rebranded to RescueAssist creating the Rescue brand of support products.

Technology and business development
GoToAssist was originally developed by Expertcity, which was founded in Santa Barbara, California in 1997. GoToAssist Remote Support enables users to access and control remote computers and other Internet-connected devices in order to provide technical support. The solution allows a desktop view of a host computer to be manipulated from a it computer. The two machines are connected through a TCP/IP network. One of Expertcity's innovations was to employ the Internet for connectivity, protecting transmissions with high-security encryption and multiple passwords. By combining a web-based software service with software installed on the host computer, transmissions could be passed through highly restrictive firewalls.

In December 2003, Citrix Systems of Fort Lauderdale, Florida, acquired the GoToAssist service and its developer, Expertcity, for $225 million, half cash and half stock. In 2017, LogMeIn, a SaaS company in Boston, completed the acquisition (through merger) with Citrix's GetGo family of products including GoToAssist. GoToAssist joined former competitor LogMeIn Rescue to create the Rescue family of support products.

Editions
GoToAssist has gone through a series of editions. Most recently, in 2018, the technician console, a desktop application, was reconfigured to a completely browser-based experience and GoToAssist was rebranded RescueAssist by LogMeIn. RescueAssist offers a modern approach to remote support. Through a plugin, users can start a support live session from a browser window on virtually any device, complete with chat, remote view, and file transfer features. There's in-channel support for popular messaging apps like Slack and includes zero-download camera share to live stream video through the end user's Android or iOS smartphone, making it easier for an IT employee to troubleshoot equipment remotely. RescueAssist supports Mac, PC, Chromebooks, iOS and Android devices.

See also
 Technical support
 Remote desktop software
 Service desk
 Virtual help desk 
 Software as a service

References and notes

Remote desktop
Remote administration software